Absaroka National Forest is a U.S. national forest in the U.S. state of Montana, established by the General Land Office on September 4, 1902, as the Absaroka Forest Reserve with a total area of .

On February 17, 1932, part of Beartooth National Forest was added. On July 1, 1945, the entire forest was divided between Lewis and Clark and Gallatin National Forests.

See also
 List of forests in Montana

References

External links
Forest History Society
Listing of the National Forests of the United States and Their Dates (from the Forest History Society website) Text from Davis, Richard C., ed. Encyclopedia of American Forest and Conservation History. New York: Macmillan Publishing Company for the Forest History Society, 1983. Vol. II, pp. 743-788.

Former National Forests of Montana
1902 establishments in Montana
1908 establishments in Montana